OGD may refer to:
 
 8-oxoguanine deaminase (8-OGD), an enzyme
 Oesophagogastroduodenoscopy, a diagnostic endoscopic procedure
 Ogden-Hinckley Airport (IATA airport code), Ogden, Utah, United States
 Organization and Guidance Department, an organizational committee of the Workers' Party of Korea, the ruling party of North Korea
 Open government data
 OGD Pictures, a Nigerian film company founded by Tade Ogidan